Pernot is a French surname. Notable people with the surname include:
Barne Pernot (born 1999), German footballer
 Georges Pernot (1879–1962), French lawyer and politician
 Hubert Pernot (1870–1946), French linguist, specializing in Modern Greek studies
Jean-Pierre Pernot (born 1947), French politician

See also
Jean-Pierre Pernaut (born 1950), French news reader

French-language surnames